Edwin Franklin McGregor (February 9, 1885 – February 8, 1955) was a Canadian professional ice hockey player. He played with the Montreal Wanderers of the National Hockey Association during the 1911–12 season.

McGregor was also a lacrosse player, representing the Tecumseh Lacrosse Club in Toronto in 1911.

References

Notes

1885 births
1955 deaths
Montreal Wanderers (NHA) players
People from Almonte, Ontario
Ice hockey people from Ontario
Canadian ice hockey right wingers